The Madrid Tennis Grand Prix is a defunct professional men's tennis tournament that was played on outdoor clay courts in Madrid, Spain with the exception of the 1984 edition which was played on indoor carpet courts. It was part of the Grand Prix tennis circuit initially and later, the ATP World Series of the ATP Tour. The tournament was established in 1972 and was played every year until 1994.

Past finals

Singles

Doubles

See also
Madrid Masters
WTA Madrid Open
List of tennis tournaments

Notes

References

External links
 ATP Tour website

 
ATP Tour
Grand Prix tennis circuit
Defunct tennis tournaments in Spain
Grand Prix
Indoor tennis tournaments
Recurring sporting events established in 1972
Recurring events disestablished in 1994